The 1988 Men's World Outdoor Bowls Championship  was held in Henderson, Auckland, New Zealand, from 30 January to 14 February 1988. 

David Bryant won a third singles Gold defeating Willie Wood in the final. New Zealand won the Pairs and Triples, Ireland won the Fours. The Leonard Trophy went to England.

The 1988 Women's World Outdoor Bowls Championship was held at the same venue but ten months later.
Janet Ackland claimed the Women's singles, Ireland won the pairs, Australia scooped the triples and fours but England won the Taylor Trophy.

Medallists

Results

Men's 'DB Draught' singles – round robin

Section A

Section B

Bronze medal match
Beare beat Williams 25–22.

Gold medal match
Bryant beat Wood 25–22.

Men's 'Budget Rent-a-Car' pairs – round robin

Section A

Section B

Bronze medal match
Wales beat Canada 24–13.

Gold medal match
New Zealand beat England 18–16.

Men's 'Mitsubishi Mirage' triples – round robin

Section A

Section B

Bronze medal match
England beat Papua New Guinea 19–14.

Gold medal match
New Zealand beat Scotland 18–15.

Men's 'Tellus' fours – round robin

Section A

Section B

Bronze medal match
England beat Wales 21–18.

Gold medal match
Ireland beat New Zealand 26–15.

W.M.Leonard Trophy

Women's 'Thomas Cook' Singles – round robin

Section A

Section B

Bronze medal match
Khan beat Lum On 25–24.

Gold medal match
Ackland beat Johnston 25–20.

Women's pairs – round robin
Section A

Section B

Bronze medal match
England beat New Zealand 20–15.

Gold medal match
Ireland beat Botswana 22–13.

Women's triples – round robin
Section A

Section B

Bronze medal match
Hong Kong beat Scotland 18–9.

Gold medal match
Australia beat England 22–13.

Women's 'Bell Tea' fours – round robin
Section A

Section B

Bronze medal match
Wales beat Ireland 22–18.

Gold medal match
Australia beat England 20–19.

Taylor Trophy

References

World Outdoor Bowls Championship
Bowls in New Zealand
1988 in bowls
1988 in New Zealand sport
January 1988 sports events in New Zealand
February 1988 sports events in New Zealand